Peter Quinney (born June 1, 1986, in Belleville, Ontario) is a professional Canadian football fullback who is currently a free agent. He was drafted by the Winnipeg Blue Bombers in the fifth round of the 2009 CFL Draft. He played CIS football for the Wilfrid Laurier Golden Hawks.

On January 1, 2010, Peter was signed by the Toronto Argonauts. He was released by the Argonauts on September 16, 2010, but was re-signed by the Argonauts on November 2, 2010. On April 21, 2011, Quinney was released by the Argonauts.

Peter successfully completed teachers college at Wilfrid Laurier's Faculty of Education. He is currently employed as a full-time teacher.

Early years
While at Laurier, he also played Slotback and Tight End. At the 2009 CFL E-Camp Quinney tied for first with 23 reps on the bench press. He played his high school football at Centennial Secondary School in Belleville, and also excelled in rugby and wrestling, winning multiple MVPs for all three sports.

While with the Kingston Grenadiers, Peter excelled and was the recipient of the prestigious coaches award in 2003.

References

External links
Wilfrid Laurier Golden Hawks bio
Toronto Argonauts press release

1986 births
Canadian football fullbacks
Living people
Sportspeople from Belleville, Ontario
Players of Canadian football from Ontario
Toronto Argonauts players
Wilfrid Laurier Golden Hawks football players
Winnipeg Blue Bombers players